Marie Angelique Virginie Sampeur (1839-1919) was a Haitian educator and poet. She is "credited with being the first Haitian woman writer".

Sampeur's poems were published in Haitian literary journals, La Ronde (1898-1902) and Haiti Littéraire et Scientifique (1912-13).

Sampeur married and divorced the poet Oswald Durand. By a later marriage, she was the mother of the classical musician Ludovic Lamothe.

References

1839 births
1919 deaths
Haitian poets
Haitian women poets